Black Rain is the tenth  studio album by British heavy metal vocalist Ozzy Osbourne, released 22 May 2007 via Epic Records. It is Osbourne's last album to date to feature drummer Mike Bordin, and the first to feature bassist Rob Nicholson. It is also the first album since 2001's Down to Earth to feature guitar player Zakk Wylde. However, he left again after the album's release, but reappeared again on Osbourne's 2022 album Patient Number 9. Black Rain debuted at No. 3 on the US Billboard 200, selling about 152,000 copies in its first week; making it Osbourne's highest debut to date. The album has been certified Gold in US.

Releases 
The album was released in several different versions. The original US version was released in a thin, brown digipak with the crowned skull Ozzy Osbourne logo (pictured lower right), and for the rest of the world, it was released in a standard jewel case featuring cover art of Osbourne with "Black Rain" falling. This cover included a booklet complete with lyrics and album credits. The US version did not include a booklet, lyrics, or album credits. The Japanese release was the same as the other releases outside of the US, except for the fact that it included two bonus tracks, "I Can't Save You", and "Nightmare". The iTunes release of the album included the aforementioned "Nightmare", plus an exclusive bonus track, (only for those who preordered through iTunes) "Love to Hate". It also included a printable pdf file of the booklet, complete with lyrics and album credits. This same booklet was later made available as a free pdf download from Osbourne's website on 1 June. The song "I Don't Wanna Stop" was also featured as the theme song for WWE Judgment Day 2007.

In the US, limited edition copies of the album were sold with special codes inside of the packets, which could be used to redeem a pair of Ozzfest 2007 tickets. Ozzfest 2007 was nicknamed "Freefest" because all tickets were free.

The album was reissued in the US on 14 August in a new jewel-case package containing the full booklet with lyrics and new colour cover art and photos, also containing CD extra bonus content featuring behind-the-scenes footage from the "Black Rain" photo shoot.

A "tour edition" version of the album was released on 20 November 2007. This release includes an extra CD with 3 recently recorded live tracks and 3 studio tracks originally available on international releases or digital versions.

Reception 

Black Rain received mixed reviews. Rolling Stone referred to the album as "highly skippable" and Sputnikmusic called it "quite embarrassing". AllMusic was somewhat less harsh in its assessment, giving the album 3.5 out of 5 stars while noting that "Nothing on Black Rain could really qualify as an Osbourne classic."

Usage in media

Television 
 WWE used "I Don't Wanna Stop" at the official theme song to the 2007 PPV Judgment Day. Osbourne later performed the song live on the May 18, 2007 edition of WWE Friday Night SmackDown.
 Osbourne performed on Jimmy Kimmel Live! on 21 May and 22 May.
 Osbourne appeared on the second annual VH1 Rock Honors, and performed three songs, "Crazy Train", "Bark at the Moon" and "I Don't Wanna Stop". It was aired on 24 May 2007 on VH1 (TV airing cut the "Bark at the Moon" performance, but it airs as a music video on shows like Rock Fest and Metal Mania.)
 Osbourne appeared on BBC1's Friday Night with Jonathan Ross on 25 May 2007 and performed "I Don't Wanna Stop".
 Osbourne performed "Not Going Away" on Spike's Scream Award Ceremony.

Video games 
 The song "I Don't Wanna Stop" is featured in the video games Guitar Hero: On Tour and Madden NFL 08 It is also featured as DLC for Rock Band and Rock Band 2 in the Ozzy Osbourne Pack 01.

Radio 
 "I Don't Wanna Stop" is used as the opening bumper music on the Boomer and Gio morning drive sports-talk program on WFAN.

Track listing

Personnel 
 Ozzy Osbourne – vocals, harmonica, production
 Zakk Wylde – guitars, keyboards, backing vocals
 Rob "Blasko" Nicholson – bass
 Mike Bordin – drums

Production
 Kevin Churko – producer, engineer, mixing
 Zack Fagan – additional engineering
 Kane Churko – additional Pro Tools
 Vlado Meller – mastering
 Joshua Marc Levy – art direction and new logo design

Charts

Weekly charts

Singles

Certifications

References

External links
 

Ozzy Osbourne albums
2007 albums
Columbia Records albums
Epic Records albums
Albums produced by Kevin Churko